Mansurabad (also Romanized as Manşūrābād) is a village in Khafrak-e Olya Rural District, Seyyedan District, Marvdasht County, Fars Province, Iran. At the 2006 census, its population was 70, in 16 families.

References 

Populated places in Marvdasht County